Joe Paul is an Indian lyricist and music composer who works in Malayalam Cinema. He began his film career in 2015 with the movie You Too Brutus.

Early life and background

Paul was born in Kunnamkulam, Thrissur, Kerala to P. P. Paul and Baby Paul and grew up in Kochi. He graduated with a Bachelor's Degree from Kerala Agricultural University, and Masters from the University of Minnesota. He is settled in Dallas with his family.

Writing career

In 2000, Paul composed and wrote his first work Krooshitharoopam, a devotional song. He made his debut as a lyricist in the Malayalam film industry in 2015 with the song Raavukalilfor the movie You Too Brutus. His popular works include lyrics for the songs from the movies Queen, Dear Comrade, Ranam, Ishq etc.

Filimography

As lyricist

References

External links 
 

Indian lyricists
Malayali people
Malayalam-language writers
Malayalam-language lyricists
University of Minnesota alumni
Living people

Year of birth missing (living people)